Greenwich Township is a township in Gloucester County, in the U.S. state of New Jersey. As of the 2020 United States census, the township's population was 4,917, an increase of 18 (+.4%) from the 2010 census count of 4,899, which in turn reflected an increase of 20 (+0.4%) from the 4,879 counted in the 2000 census.

Greenwich Township was first formed on March 1, 1695, and was formally incorporated as one of New Jersey's initial group of 104 townships by an act of the New Jersey Legislature on February 21, 1798. Over the centuries, portions of the township were taken to form Woolwich Township (March 7, 1767), Franklin Township (January 27, 1820), Spicer Township (March 13, 1844; now Harrison Township), Mantua Township (February 23, 1853), East Greenwich Township (February 10, 1881), and Paulsboro (March 2, 1904). The township was named for Greenwich, England.

History
C. A. Nothnagle Log House in Greenwich Township is one of the oldest standing wooden structures built by European settlers in the Eastern United States. It was likely built by early Finnish-Swedish settlers after 1638 but before 1700; its precise age has not been definitively determined. A plaque at the house indicates that the structure was built between 1638 and 1643, while the National Register of Historic Places web site states: "Period of Significance: 1650–1699". The one-room cabin is constructed of square-hewn logs with a low-beamed ceiling with a large corner fireplace in a rear corner.

Geography
According to the U.S. Census Bureau, the township had a total area of 12.03 square miles (31.16 km2), including 8.96 square miles (23.21 km2) of land and 3.07 square miles (7.95 km2) of water (25.50%).

Gibbstown, with a 2010 population of 3,739,) is an unincorporated community and census-designated place (CDP) in Greenwich Township. Other unincorporated communities, localities, and places located partially or completely in the township are Clements, Green, Monds Island, and Thompsons Point.

The township borders East Greenwich Township, Logan Township, and Paulsboro in Gloucester County. Greenwich Township also borders the Delaware River.

Demographics

2010 census

The Census Bureau's 2006–2010 American Community Survey showed that, in 2010 inflation-adjusted dollars, median household income was $63,817 with a margin of error of +/− $7,652, and median family income was $81,250 (+/− $14,406). Males had a median income of $47,927 (+/− $6,567) versus $41,750 (+/− $4,066) for females. The per capita income for the borough was $30,685 (+/− $3,226). About 8.1% of families and 8.9% of the population were below the poverty line, including 16.7% of those under age 18 and 5.9% of those age 65 or over.

2000 census
As of the 2000 United States census, there were 4,879 people, 1,866 households, and 1,393 families residing in the township. The racial makeup of the township was 94.55% White, 3.32% African American, 0.10% Native American, 0.68% Asian, 0.02% Pacific Islander, 0.27% from other races, and 1.07% from two or more races. Hispanic or Latino of any race were 1.54% of the population.

There were 1,866 households, out of which 31.3% had children under the age of 18 living with them, 58.9% were married couples living together, 10.9% had a female householder with no husband present, and 25.3% were non-families. 22.1% of all households were made up of individuals, and 12.2% had someone living alone who was 65 years of age or older. The average household size was 2.61 and the average family size was 3.05.

In the township, the population was spread out, with 22.8% under the age of 18, 7.4% from 18 to 24, 27.9% from 25 to 44, 23.9% from 45 to 64, and 18.1% who were 65 years of age or older. The median age was 40 years. For every 100 females, there were 95.4 males. For every 100 females age 18 and over, there were 92.0 males.

The median income for a household in the township was $53,651, and the median income for a family was $60,565. Males had a median income of $41,875 versus $31,627 for females. The per capita income for the township was $24,791. About 1.3% of families and 3.6% of the population were below the poverty line, including 3.9% of those under age 18 and 5.3% of those age 65 or over.

Government

Local government
Greenwich Township is governed within the Faulkner Act, formally known as the Optional Municipal Charter Law, under the Mayor-Council Plan A form of New Jersey municipal government, one of 71 of New Jersey's 564 municipalities that use this form. The governing body is comprised of five members elected at-large in partisan elections to serve three-year terms on a staggered basis, with two council seats up for election in each of the first two years and the mayoral seat up for vote in the third year of a three-year cycle.

, the Mayor of Greenwich Township is Democrat Vincent Giovannitti, whose term of office ends December 31, 2023. Members of the Greenwich Township Council are Council President Joseph L. DiMenna (D, 2022;elected to serve an unexpired term), Antonio Chila (D, 2022), Bryan Nastase (R, 2024) and Wanda Tranquillo (R, 2024).

Federal, state, and county representation 
Greenwich Township is located in the 1st Congressional District and is part of New Jersey's 3rd state legislative district.

Politics
As of March 2011, there were a total of 3,690 registered voters in Greenwich Township, of which 2,246 (60.9%) were registered as Democrats, 444 (12.0%) were registered as Republicans and 1,000 (27.1%) were registered as Unaffiliated. There were no voters registered to other parties.

In the 2012 presidential election, Democrat Barack Obama received 53.5% of the vote (1,435 cast), ahead of Republican Mitt Romney with 45.0% (1,206 votes), and other candidates with 1.5% (39 votes), among the 2,712 ballots cast by the township's 3,711 registered voters (32 ballots were spoiled), for a turnout of 73.1%. In the 2008 presidential election, Democrat Barack Obama received 51.8% of the vote (1,564 cast), ahead of Republican John McCain with 44.8% (1,353 votes) and other candidates with 1.6% (47 votes), among the 3,022 ballots cast by the township's 3,863 registered voters, for a turnout of 78.2%. In the 2004 presidential election, Democrat John Kerry received 53.9% of the vote (1,602 ballots cast), outpolling Republican George W. Bush with 44.0% (1,308 votes) and other candidates with 0.9% (34 votes), among the 2,972 ballots cast by the township's 3,853 registered voters, for a turnout percentage of 77.1.

In the 2013 gubernatorial election, Republican Chris Christie received 62.2% of the vote (1,138 cast), ahead of Democrat Barbara Buono with 37.0% (677 votes), and other candidates with 0.8% (14 votes), among the 1,915 ballots cast by the township's 3,654 registered voters (86 ballots were spoiled), for a turnout of 52.4%. In the 2009 gubernatorial election, Democrat Jon Corzine received 49.6% of the vote (1,103 ballots cast), ahead of Republican Chris Christie with 36.8% (817 votes), Independent Chris Daggett with 8.4% (187 votes) and other candidates with 0.9% (20 votes), among the 2,222 ballots cast by the township's 3,169 registered voters, yielding a 70.1% turnout.

Education
Greenwich Township School District serves public school students in kindergarten through eighth grade. As of the 2018–19 school year, the district, comprised of two schools, had an enrollment of 408 students and 46.0 classroom teachers (on an FTE basis), for a student–teacher ratio of 8.9:1. Schools in the district (with 2018–19 enrollment data from the National Center for Education Statistics) are Broad Street Elementary School with 273 students in grades K–4 and Nehaunsey Middle School with 132 students in grades 5–8.

Public school students in ninth through twelfth grades attend Paulsboro High School in Paulsboro as part of a sending/receiving relationship with the Paulsboro Public Schools. As of the 2018–19 school year, the high school had an enrollment of 322 students and 31.1 classroom teachers (on an FTE basis), for a student–teacher ratio of 10.4:1.

Students in the county are eligible to apply to attend Gloucester County Institute of Technology, a four-year high school in Deptford Township that provides technical and vocational education. As a public school, students do not pay tuition to attend the school.

Guardian Angels Regional School is a K–8 school that operates under the auspices of the Roman Catholic Diocese of Camden. Its Pre-K–3 campus is in Gibbstown while its 4–8 campus is in Paulsboro.

Transportation

Roads and highways

Several major roadways cross the township. Route 44 passes through the center of the township and U.S. Route 130 and Interstate 295 multiplexed together pass near the town's southern center with three interchanges: Exits 15, 16, and 17 on the border with neighboring East Greenwich Township.

Public transportation
NJ Transit bus service is available between the township and Philadelphia on the 402 route.

The Port of Paulsboro includes marine transfer operations at PBF Energy's Paulsboro Refinery in Gibbstown and at Thompson Point, and is served by SMS Rail Lines for the rail spur to the refinery and the freight rail Penns Grove Secondary.

Notable people

People who were born in, residents of, or otherwise closely associated with Greenwich Township include:
 Stanley Druckenmiller (born 1953), hedge fund manager
 Lewis Earle (born 1933), member of the Florida House of Representatives from 1968 to 1974
 Sylvia Earle (born 1935), marine biologist
 Alex Silvestro (born 1988), former football tight end / defensive end who played in the NFL for the Baltimore Ravens and New England Patriots

References

External links

 Greenwich Township website
 Greenwich Township School District
 
 School Data for the Greenwich Township School District, National Center for Education Statistics
 Paulsboro High School
 Greenwich forum

 
1695 establishments in New Jersey
Faulkner Act (mayor–council)
Populated places established in 1695
Townships in Gloucester County, New Jersey
New Jersey populated places on the Delaware River